Moonlight Shadows is the seventeenth album by British instrumental group The Shadows, released in 1986 through Polydor Records. The album reached number 6 in a 16-week run on the UK Album Charts.

This album consists entirely of cover songs by The Police, Lionel Richie, Jennifer Rush, The Beatles, Phil Collins, Elaine Paige, Bruce Springsteen, Procol Harum, Mike Oldfield, The Commodores, Rod Stewart, Stevie Wonder, Elaine Paige & Barbara Dickson, The Moody Blues, John Lennon & Dire Straits. Several tracks were lifted from previously released albums.

The only single released from the album was "Moonlight Shadow", which did not chart.

The album was recorded and mixed by Dick Plant at Honeyhill and Nivram Studios, Hertfordshire.

Release
Moonlight Shadows was released on LP and CD simultaneously as the group's third CD release.

Track listing

Personnel
Hank Marvin—Lead Guitar
Bruce Welch—Rhythm Guitar
Brian Bennett—Drums, Percussion
Cliff Hall—Keyboards

With

Paul Westwood—Bass Guitar
Alan Jones—Bass Guitar

Certifications

References

1986 albums
The Shadows albums
Polydor Records albums